Portal Stories: Mel is a single-player mod for Portal 2 developed by Prism Studios. The mod was released on June 25, 2015, for Microsoft Windows, and OS X systems, available freely to users who own Portal 2 on Steam. Like the official Portal games, it is a puzzle-platform game that involves placing interconnected "portals" to solve puzzles. Set in the Portal universe, players control the test subject Mel, who has to escape an underground facility after she spends decades in artificial hibernation. Reviewers largely praised the mod's visual design and ambition, though they criticized its difficulty; later updates added a "story mode" that made the puzzles easier.

Gameplay

Like Portal 2, Portal Stories: Mel is a puzzle-platform game played from the first-person perspective as the player character Mel. Featuring the same mechanics as the original game, the player solves puzzles with a prototype "portal gun", which allows them to create a connected opening on two different flat planes. Portals can only be placed on certain surfaces, and portal shooting can be blocked via electric barriers. Additionally, the player can use a variety of other puzzle mechanics, including "light bridges" that allow traversal over gaps, "gels" that affect the player's movement, and cubes that can be placed on buttons.

There are 22 levels in the game; the developers expect players to take 6 to 10 hours to complete it.

Plot

Based in the same universe as the official Portal games, the story is initially set in 1952, when Aperture Science is still a fledgling company.  Players take control of Mel, a German olympian who has been recruited as a test subject.

She arrives by tram at the Aperture Science Innovators headquarters in Michigan, and makes her way through Aperture's company town and into a massive underground complex. Aperture's CEO, Cave Johnson, speaks to Mel through prerecorded messages via intercom, informing her that she will take part in one of their smaller tests, the Aperture Innovators Short Term Relaxation Vault. The test goes wrong, and Mel is put in indefinite stasis.   

Awakening in the distant future, Mel follows what seems to be the voice of Cave Johnson and obtains a portal gun. The voice reveals that he is not actually Cave Johnson but a maintenance core named Virgil, who offers to help Mel escape. Virgil guides Mel through the remnants of the old facility, explaining that the destruction of GLaDOS in Portal caused most of the control systems in the facility to falter. 

Continuing upwards, they learn that the reserve power has caused a prototype security system, AEGIS, to become active. With GLaDOS absent, AEGIS attempts to track them through the facility to eliminate them, deeming them potential threats to Aperture's (long-dead) scientists. Virgil realizes the only way for Mel to escape is to disable AEGIS. Going through overgrown test chambers, they eventually arrive at AEGIS's central core and successfully disable it. Mel enters the code to shut down AEGIS, but while doing so, she and Virgil learn that it was flooding the facility in an attempt to destroy GLaDOS's remains. Mel surrenders her portal gun and exits the facility in an elevator, bidding Virgil goodbye. At the top of the elevator, she finds the town where she entered Aperture in ruins. In a post-credits scene, AEGIS has enough power left to initiate one final fail-safe: waking up the test subject Chell by draining the reserve power so she can escape, setting up the events of Portal 2.

Development and release
Portal Stories: Mel was developed over the course of four years by a small independent team of Portal fans under the name Prism Studios.
Development for the mod started in May 2011, with it originally being intended to launch in early 2012. After several delays, on March 21, 2013, it was announced that several maps had to be rebuilt to meet satisfactory quality, with several members of the team changing.

The first closed beta was announced on August 4, 2013, leading to several maps being re-worked and updated to higher quality standards. The team also saw the addition of a new modeler and an extra level designer. On June 20, 2014, the development team announced that they were aiming for a release in the first quarter of 2015, with support for Windows, and OS X systems. On August 1, 2014 the mod advanced through the Steam Greenlight program. After being successfully green-lit, the developers started a new closed beta, which expanded every month with new players to gather more feedback. In a February 2015 developer update, Prism announced that they had to once again postpone the release.  During the whole process, the team consulted Valve for development advice.

On June 25, 2015, the mod was released on Steam as a free download for owners of Portal 2, alongside some developer commentary videos on YouTube. In response to complaints about the high difficulty level of the mod, the developers released a "Story Mode" campaign on August 31, 2015, with certain puzzles tweaked to reduce their difficulty. The "Story Mode" puzzles became the new default, and the original puzzles were repurposed as an alternative, higher-difficulty setting known as "Advanced Mode".

Portal Stories: VR, a virtual reality modification of Portal 2, was released on 16 May 2016, and is a small campaign designed for the room-scale VR that SteamVR offers.

Afterwards, the studio switched from being a mod team to being a standalone game development company in August 2016, releasing The Captives: Plot of the Demiurge in 2018, but shut down around December 2020.

Reception
Many media outlets praised the mod's ambition and polish, though they often criticised its challenging levels.  For the Washington Post, writer Michael Thomson commented on the mod's difficulty, stating that he "found the game unusually difficult, almost physically fatiguing", but that he was "hesitant to say those qualities are negatives". In contrast to Portal 2s puzzles that guided the player to discover solutions on their own, Mels difficulty was a "reminder that games are just as beautiful when they expect the inconceivable from us". Eurogamer writer Ian Higton described it as the Dark Souls of Portal games, stating that "if you've not up to speed with everything, their test chambers can be really punishing", but nevertheless stated that it "nails what it means to be a Valve game". Although he rated the mod 7.5 overall, Ruslan Gubajdulllin of Overclockers.ru criticized the game's pacing, stating that the developers "practically do not give you time to rest" from solving puzzles.

Higton praised the mod's visual design, which he thought gave the mod "its own flavour". Conversely, Gubajdulllin stated that while the developers had a "good sense of taste", a discerning player's "inner perfectionist will be horrified" by the mixed quality of the assets.  PC Gamer reviewer Christopher Livingston stated that he "didn't find the humor particularly effective", though it was written "with a lot of enthusiasm and an obvious fondness for the Portal series".

Awards and nominations
 Portal Stories: Mel won the award for "Best Fan Creation" at The Game Awards 2015.
 In 2015, it was nominated for Mod DB's "Mod of the Year" in the Player's Choice category and won the Best Singleplayer mod in the Editors' Choice.

References

External links

 Official website archived by the Wayback Machine

2015 video games
Abandoned buildings and structures in fiction
First-person shooters
MacOS games
Portal (series)
Puzzle video games
Science fiction video games
Source (game engine) mods
Video games developed in the United Kingdom
Video games featuring female protagonists
Video games set in 1952
Video games set in Michigan
Windows games
Laboratories in fiction
Linux games
Fangames
The Game Awards winners